The 2008 Mississippi State Bulldogs baseball team represented Mississippi State University in the NCAA Division I baseball season of 2008.  The team was coached by Ron Polk, in his 35th year as a collegiate head coach, and his 29th at Mississippi State. During mid-season, Coach Polk announced he would resign effective at the conclusion of the season. Following the conclusion of the season, former MSU standout and University of Kentucky Head Baseball coach John Cohen was announced by incoming AD Greg Bryne as the new Mississippi State Baseball Coach for 2009.

Pre-season
The 2008 version of the Mississippi State Bulldogs Baseball team were looking to build on the success of the 2007 MSU Baseball Campaign after advancing to the College World Series. Based upon the achievements the year before, the recruiting class of 2008 was ranked 26th by Collegiate Baseball
The team was predicted to finish second in the SEC West
Mississippi State was ranked 24th in the preseason NCBWA poll, 23rd in the USA Today/ESPN Coaches Poll, and 19th in the Rivals.com preseason poll

Infielder Brandon Turner was named to the 2008 preseason Louisville Slugger TPX 2008 All-America second team and to the Golden Spikes Award preseason watch list.  Pitcher Aaron Weatherford was named to the preseason watch list for the NCWBA Stopper of the Year Award.  Turner and Weatherford were both named to the preseason watch list for the 2008 Brooks Wallace Award.

Roster and Stats

Coaches

Players

Pitchers

These players are on the roster, but did not appear in a game and were redshirted.

Schedule and results

|- align="center" bgcolor="#bbffbb"
| 1 || February 22 || at North Florida || 8-2 || Baseball Grounds of Jacksonville || Pigott (1-0) || Pryor || --- || 1191 ||  1-0 ||
|- align="center" bgcolor="#ffbbbb"
| 2 || February 23 || at North Florida || 9-17 || Harmon Stadium || Raiford || Wesson (0-1) || Stohr || 1121 || 1-1 ||
|- align="center" bgcolor="#ffbbbb"
| 3 || February 24 || at North Florida || 6-11 ||Harmon Stadium || Pryor || Bowen (0-1) || --- || 1048 || 1-2 ||
|- align="center" bgcolor="#bbffbb"
| 4 || February 26 || UAB || 9-2 || Dudy Noble Field ||F. Moore (1-0) || Crawford || Weatherford (1) || 5810 || 2-2 ||
|- align="center" bgcolor="#bbffbb"
| 5 || March 1 || Air Force || 3-1 || Dudy Noble Field || Pigott (2-0) || Truesdale || Weatherford (2) || 6866 ||  3-2 ||
|- align="center" bgcolor="#ffbbbb"
| 6 || March 1 || Air Force || 4-6 || Dudy Noble Field || Pingel  || Crosswhite (0-1) || Petro || 6866 || 3-3 ||
|- align="center" bgcolor="#bbffbb"
| 7 || March 2 || Air Force || 16-8 || Dudy Noble Field || Bowen (1-1) || Petro || --- || 6438 || 4-3 ||
|- align="center" bgcolor="#ffbbbb"
| 8 || March 4 || Arkansas-Little Rock || 5-9 || Dudy Noble Field || Klumpp || F. Moore (1-1) || --- || 5657
|| 4-4 ||
|- align="center" bgcolor="#bbffbb"
| 9 || March 5 || Arkansas-Little Rock || 6-3 || Dudy Noble Field || Carver (1-0) || Rominger || Lalor (1) || 5851 || 5-4 ||
|- align="center" bgcolor="#ffbbbb"
| 10 || March 9 || Baylor || 4-5 || Dudy Noble Field || Volz || Pigott (2-1) || Fritsch || 6021 || 5-5 ||
|- align="center" bgcolor="#ffbbbb"
| 11 || March 9 || Baylor || 11-16 || Dudy Noble Field || Tolleson || Crosswhite (0-2) || --- || 6021 || 5-6 ||
|- align="center" bgcolor="#ffbbbb"
| 12 || March 10 || Baylor || 3-6 || Dudy Noble Field || Kempf || Bowen (1-2) || Cassavechia || 5622 || 5-7 ||
|- align="center" bgcolor="#bbffbb"
| 13 || March 11 || Mississippi Valley State || 15-0 || Dudy Noble Field || Swindle (1-0) || Reid || --- || 5725 || 6-7 ||
|- align="center" bgcolor="#bbffbb"
| 14 || March 12 || Mississippi Valley State || 11-5 || Dudy Noble Field || Wilson (1-0) || Gafford || --- || 5725 || 7-7 ||
|- align="center"  bgcolor="#ffbbbb"
| 15 || March 14 || Ole Miss || 6-15 || Dudy Noble Field || Lynn || F. Moore (1-2) || Morgan || 6571 || 7-8 || 0-1
|- align="center"  bgcolor="#ffbbbb"
| 16 || March 15 || Ole Miss || 6-11 || Dudy Noble Field || Bittle || Lalor (0-1) || --- || 7482 || 7-9 || 0-2
|- align="center"  bgcolor="#bbffbb"
| 17 || March 16 || Ole Miss || 4-0 || Dudy Noble Field || Bowen (2-2) || Baker || --- || 3025 || 8-9 || 1-2
|- align="center"  bgcolor="#bbffbb"
| 18 || March 18 || at UAB || 24-10 || Young Memorial Field || Swindle (2-0) || Huddleston || --- || 575 || 9-9 ||
|- align="center" bgcolor="#ffbbbb"
| 19 || March 21 || at South Carolina || 1-9 || Sarge Frye Field || Cisco || Carver (1-1) || --- || 4810 || 9-10 || 1-3
|- align="center" bgcolor="#ffbbbb"
| 20 || March 22 || at South Carolina || 1-4 || Sarge Frye Field || Atwood || Swindle (2-1) || Todd || 5029 || 9-11 || 1-4
|- align="center" bgcolor="#ffbbbb"
| 21 || March 23 || at South Carolina ||3-10|| Sarge Frye Field || Cooper || Bowen (2-3) ||  || 4313 || 9-12 || 1-5
|- align="center" bgcolor="#ffbbbb"
| 22 || March 25 || South Alabama ||5-6|| Dudy Noble Field || LaGrow || Houston (0-1) || G.Johnson || 5866 || 9-13 ||
|- align="center" bgcolor="#bbffbb"
| 23 || March 26 || South Alabama ||7-6(11)|| Dudy Noble Field || Crosswhite (1-2) || Dunning ||  || 6037 || 10-13 ||
|- align="center" bgcolor="#bbffbb"
| 24 || March 28 || Georgia ||3-2(10)|| Dudy Noble Field ||Crosswhite (2-2) || Fields ||  || 7564 || 11-13 || 2-5
|- align="center" bgcolor="#ffbbbb"
| 25 || March 29 || Georgia ||1-5|| Dudy Noble Field || Dodson || Swindle (2-2) ||  || 9424 || 11-14 || 2-6
|- align="center" bgcolor="#ffbbbb"
| 26 || March 30 || Georgia ||3-5(10)|| Dudy Noble Field || McRee || Lalor (0-2) || Fields || 6426 || 11-15 || 2-7
|- align="center" bgcolor="#bbffbb"
| 27 || April 1 || Austin Peay ||13-4|| Dudy Noble Field ||Wilson (2-0) || Brisbin ||  || 5817 || 12-15 ||
|- align="center" bgcolor="#bbffbb"
| 28 || April 2 || Austin Peay ||10-2|| Dudy Noble Field || Holinghead (1-0) || Kole ||  || 5862 || 13-15 ||
|- align="center" bgcolor="#bbffbb"
| 29 || April 4 || at Kentucky ||6-5|| Cliff Hagan Stadium ||Lalor (1-2) || Baber ||Weatherford (3) ||  || 14-15 || 3-7
|- align="center" bgcolor="#ffbbbb"
| 30 || April 5 || at Kentucky ||4-13|| Cliff Hagan Stadium || Green ||Swindle (2-3) ||  || 2772 || 14-16 || 3-8
|- align="center" bgcolor="#ffbbbb"
| 31 || April 6 || at Kentucky ||8-9|| Cliff Hagan Stadium || Paxton  ||Busby (0-1)||  || 2696 || 14-17|| 3-9
|- align="center" bgcolor="#ffbbbb"
| 32 || April 8 || at Memphis ||8-9(10)|| AutoZone Park || Martin ||Busby (0-2) ||  || 729 || 14-18 ||
|- align="center" bgcolor="#ffbbbb"
| 33 || April 11 || Vanderbilt ||8-15|| Dudy Noble Field  || Minor ||Busby (0-3) ||  || 6330 || 14-19 || 3-10
|- align="center" bgcolor="#ffbbbb"
| 34 || April 12 || Vanderbilt ||0-16|| Dudy Noble Field || Cotham ||Bowen (2-4) ||  || 6165 || 14-20 || 3-11
|- align="center" bgcolor="#ffbbbb"
| 35 || April 13 || Vanderbilt ||3-4|| Dudy Noble Field || Christiani ||Lalor (1-3) || Brewer || 5827 || 14-21 || 3-12
|- align="center" bgcolor="#bbffbb"
| 36 || April 15 || vs. Ole Miss ||6-5|| Trustmark Park ||Weatherford (1-0) || Baker ||  || 7862 || 15-21 ||
|- align="center" bgcolor="#ffbbbb"
| 37 || April 19 || at Alabama ||7-21|| Sewell-Thomas Stadium || Hyatt ||Crosswhite (2-3) ||  ||  || 15-22 || 3-13
|- align="center" bgcolor="#bbffbb"
| 38 || April 19 || at Alabama ||6-4|| Sewell-Thomas Stadium || Lalor (2-3) || Quigley ||Weatherford (4) || 5215  || 16-22 || 4-13
|- align="center" bgcolor="#ffbbbb"
| 39 || April 20 || at Alabama ||3-4|| Sewell-Thomas Stadium || Graham ||Busby (0-4) ||  || 4201 || 16-23 || 4-14
|- align="center" bgcolor="#ffbbbb"
| 40 || April 22 || at Southern Miss ||7-11|| Pete Taylor Park || Johnston ||Whitney (0-1) || Weathers || 4525 || 16-24 ||
|- align="center" bgcolor="#ffbbbb"
| 41 || April 23 || at Southern Miss ||7-12|| Pete Taylor Park || Ballinger ||Hollinghead (1-1) ||  || 4464 || 16-25 ||
|- align="center" bgcolor="#bbffbb"
| 42 || April 25 || Tennessee ||4-3(12)|| Dudy Noble Field ||Weatherford (2-0) || Rosas ||  || 6170 || 17-25 || 5-14
|- align="center" bgcolor="#ffbbbb"
| 43 || April 26 || Tennessee ||9-12|| Dudy Noble Field || Morgado ||Bowen (2-5) ||  || 6174 || 17-26 || 5-15
|- align="center" bgcolor="#bbffbb"
| 44 || April 27 || Tennessee ||7-3(8)|| Dudy Noble Field ||Lalor(3-3) || Harris || 6027 ||  || 18-26 || 6-15
|- align="center" bgcolor="#ffbbbb"
| 45 || May 2 || at Auburn ||4-11|| Samford Stadium || Dayton ||Crosswhite (2-4) ||  || 2115 || 18-27 || 6-16
|- align="center" bgcolor="#bbffbb"
| 46 || May 3 || at Auburn ||4-3|| Samford Stadium ||Bowen (3-5)|| Thompson ||Weatherford(5) || 2523 || 19-27 || 7-16
|- align="center" bgcolor="#ffbbbb"
| 47 || May 4 || at Auburn ||2-12|| Samford Stadium || Greinke ||Pigott (2-2) || Woodall || 2306 || 19-28 || 7-17
|- align="center" bgcolor="#ffbbbb"
| 48 || May 6 || at MTSU ||5-20|| Reese Smith Field || Alvis ||Whitney (0-2)|| Hyde || 921 || 19-29 ||
|- align="center" bgcolor="#bbffbb"
| 49 || May 7 || at MTSU ||4-3|| Reese Smith Field ||Busby(1-4)|| Francescon ||Weatherford(6) || 713 || 20-29 ||
|- align="center" bgcolor="#ffbbbb"
| 50 || May 9 || at LSU ||6-15|| Alex Box Stadium || Coleman ||  ||Crosswhite(2-5)|| 8548 || 20-30 || 7-18
|- align="center" bgcolor="#ffbbbb"
| 51 || May 10 || at LSU ||4-16|| Alex Box Stadium || B. Martin||Bowen(3-6)||  || 8312 || 20-31 || 7-19
|- align="center" bgcolor="#ffbbbb"
| 52 || May 11 || at LSU ||6-9|| Alex Box Stadium || Bradford||Pigott (2-3)|| Bradshaw  || 8701 || 20-32 || 7-20
|- align="center" bgcolor="#bbffbb"
| 53 || May 13 || Memphis ||4-1|| Dudy Noble Field ||Crosswhite (3-5)|| Martin ||Weatherford (7) || 5731 || 21-32 ||
|- align="center" bgcolor="#bbffbb"
| 54 || May 15 || Arkansas ||6-5|| Dudy Noble Field ||Weatherford(3-0)|| Wells ||  || 5865 || 22-32 || 8-20
|- align="center" bgcolor="#bbffbb"
| 55 || May 16 || Arkansas ||6-5|| Dudy Noble Field ||Wilson (3-0) || Bolsinger ||  || 6177 || 23-32 || 9-20
|- align="center" bgcolor="#ffbbbb"
| 56 || May 17 || Arkansas ||10-15|| Dudy Noble Field || Mahler ||Weatherford(3-1)||  || 6738 || 23-33 || 9-21
|-

References 

Mississippi State Bulldogs Baseball Team, 2008
Mississippi State Bulldogs baseball seasons
Miss